Chausson is a French surname. Notable people with the surname include:

Anne-Caroline Chausson, French BMX and mountain bike racer
Ernest Chausson (1855–1899), French composer
Jacques Chausson ( 1618–1661), French writer

French-language surnames